The GRP All-Star Big Band was a contemporary big band assembled in the late 1980s by Dave Grusin and Larry Rosen, the founders of GRP Records. The band played new arrangements of popular jazz pieces from the 1950s and 1960s.

Its albums GRP All-Star Big Band and Dave Grusin Presents GRP All-Star Big Band Live! were nominated for Grammys, and its album All Blues won the 1995 Grammy Award for Best Large Jazz Ensemble Album.

Band members

 Randy Brecker – trumpet
 Chuck Findley – trumpet
 Sal Marquez – trumpet
 Arturo Sandoval – trumpet
 Byron Stripling – trumpet
 George Bohanon – trombone
 Timmy Capello – saxophone
 Eric Marienthal – first alto saxophone
 Nelson Rangell – second alto saxophone
 Bob Mintzer – first tenor saxophone
 Ernie Watts – second tenor saxophone
 Tom Scott – baritone saxophone
 Phillip Bent – flute
 Dave Valentin – flute
 Eddie Daniels – clarinet
 David Benoit – piano
 Chick Corea – piano
 Russell Ferrante – piano
 Dave Grusin – piano
 Kenny Kirkland – piano
 Ramsey Lewis – piano
 Gary Burton – vibraphone
 Lee Ritenour – guitar
 John Patitucci – double bass
 Dave Weckl – drum set
 Carlos Vega - drums
 Alex Acuña – percussion

Discography
 Dave Grusin Presents GRP All-Stars Live in Japan (1980)
 GRP All-Star Big Band (1992)
 Dave Grusin Presents GRP All-Star Big Band Live! (1993)
 All Blues (1995)

References

External links 
 

1980s establishments in the United States
1990s disestablishments in the United States
American jazz ensembles
Big bands
GRP Records artists
Musical groups established in the 1980s
Musical groups disestablished in the 1990s